King Ayisoba born Albert Apoozore ( 1974) is a Ghanaian traditional musician known for his unique style of music alongside the kologo.

Early life 
Ayisoba was born in Bongo Soe in the Upper East Region of Ghana.

Career 
He used to play and sing along with the late Terry Bonchaka, before Terry's death.

Discography

Studio albums 
2006: Modern Ghanaians
2008: Africa
2012: Don't Do The Bad Thing
2014: Wicked Leaders
2017: 1000 Can Die

Awards

See also 

 Batakari Festival

References 

1974 births
Living people